{{Infobox kommune
|name                   = Trøndelag
|fylke                  = yes
|former                 = 
|native_name            = Trööndelagen fylhkentjïelte
|native_name_lang       = sma
|other_name             = 
|official_name          = 
|image_skyline          = 
|image_caption          = 
|idnumber               = 50
|county                 = Trøndelag
|district               = Central Norway
|capital                = Steinkjer
|established            = 1 Jan 2018
|preceded               = Nord-Trøndelag and Sør-Trøndelag counties
|disestablished         = 
|succeeded              = 
|demonym                = Trønder
|language               = Neutral
|coatofarms             = 
|flag                   = Flag of Nord-Trøndelag.svg
|webpage                = trondelagfylke.no
|county_mayor           = Tore O. Sandvik
|county_mayor_party     = Ap
|county_mayor_as_of     = 2018
|governor               = Frank Jenssen
|governor_party         = H
|governor_as_of         = 2018
|area_rank              = 3
|area_total_km2         = 42202
|area_land_km2          = 39494
|area_water_km2         = 2708
|area_water_percent     = 6.4
|population_as_of       = 2021
|population_rank        = 5
|population_total       = 471,124
|population_density_km2 = 11.9
|population_increase    = 9.6
|income_per_capita      = 
|income_year            = 
|GDP                    = 
|GDP_year               = 
|GDP_rank               = 
|GDP_rank_percent       = 
|coordinates            = 
|module={{Historical populations
|footnote = Source: Statistics Norway . 2017 data
|state=uncollapsed
|width=100%
|1769|78274
|1951|307635
|1960|327127
|1970|350297
|1980|368942
|1990|377202
|2000|389960
|2010|422102
|2020|468702 
}}

}}

Trøndelag is a county in the central part of Norway. It was created in 1687, then named Trondhjem County; in 1804 the county was split into Nord-Trøndelag and Sør-Trøndelag by the King of Denmark-Norway, and the counties were reunited in 2018 after a vote of the two counties in 2016.

The largest city in Trøndelag is the city of Trondheim. The administrative centre is Steinkjer, while Trondheim functions as the office of the county mayor. Both cities serve the office of the county governor; however, Steinkjer houses the main functions.

Trøndelag county and the neighbouring Møre og Romsdal county together form what is known as Central Norway. A person from Trøndelag is called a trønder. The dialect spoken in the area, trøndersk, is characterized by dropping out most vowel endings; see apocope.

Trøndelag is one of the most fertile regions of Norway, with large agricultural output. The majority of the production ends up in the Norwegian cooperative system for meat and milk, but farm produce is a steadily growing business.

Name
History

People have lived in this region for thousands of years. In the early iron-age Trøndelag was divided into several petty kingdoms called fylki. The different fylki had a common law, and an early parliament or thing. It was called Frostating and was held at the Frosta-peninsula. By some, this is regarded as the first real democracy.

In the time after Håkon Grjotgardsson (838-900), Trøndelag was ruled by the Jarl of Lade. Lade is located in the eastern part of Trondheim, bordering the Trondheimsfjord. The powerful Jarls of Lade continued to play a very significant political role in Norway up to 1030.

Jarls of Lade (Ladejarl'') were:
 Håkon Grjotgardsson, the first jarl of Lade.
 Sigurd Håkonsson, son of Håkon. Killed by Harald Greyhide.
 Håkon Sigurdsson, son of Sigurd. Conspired with Harald Bluetooth against Harald Greyhide, and subsequently became vassal of Harald Bluetooth, and in reality independent ruler of Norway. After the arrival of Olaf Trygvason, Håkon quickly lost all support and was killed by his own slave, Tormod Kark, in 995.
 Eirik Håkonsson, son of Håkon. Together with his brother, Svein, governor of Norway under Sweyn Forkbeard of Denmark from 1000 to 1012.
 Håkon Eiriksson, son of Eirik. Governor of Norway under Sweyn Forkbeard of Denmark from 1012 to 1015.

Trøndelag (together with parts of Møre og Romsdal) was briefly ceded in 1658 to Sweden in the Treaty of Roskilde and was ruled by king Charles X until it was returned to Denmark-Norway after the Treaty of Copenhagen in 1660. During that time, the Swedes conscripted 2,000 men in Trøndelag, forcing young boys down to 15 years of age to join the Swedish armies fighting against Poland and Brandenburg. Charles X feared the Trønders would rise against their Swedish occupiers, and thought it wise to keep a large part of the men away. Only about one-third of the men ever returned to their homes; some of them were forced to settle in the then Swedish Duchy of Estonia, as the Swedes thought it would be easier to rule the Trønders there, utilising the ancient maxim of divide and rule.

In the fall of 1718, during the Great Northern War, General Carl Gustaf Armfeldt was ordered by king Charles XII of Sweden to lead a Swedish army of 10,000 men into Trøndelag and take Trondheim. Because of his poor supply lines back to Sweden, Armfeldt's army had to live off the land, causing great suffering to the people of the region. Armfeldt's campaign failed: the defenders of Trondheim succeeded in repelling his siege. After Charles XII was killed in the siege of Fredriksten in Norway's southeast, Armfeldt was ordered back into Sweden. During the ensuing retreat, his 6,000 surviving threadbare and starving Caroleans were caught in a fierce blizzard. Thousands of Caroleans froze to death in the Norwegian mountains, and hundreds more were crippled for life.

Government

The county is governed by the Trøndelag County Municipality. The town of Steinkjer is the seat of the county governor and county administration. However, both the county governor and Trøndelag County Municipality also have offices in Trondheim.

The county oversees the 41 upper secondary schools, including nine private schools. Six of the schools have more than 1000 students: four in Trondheim plus the Steinkjer Upper Secondary School and the Ole Vig Upper Secondary School in Stjørdalshalsen. The county has ten Folk high schools, with an eleventh folk high school being possibly being opened in Røros, with a possible start in 2019.

Districts
The county is often sub-divided into several geographical regions:
 Namdal, the greater Namsen river valley
 Fosen, the Fosen peninsula and surrounding areas
 Innherred, the areas surrounding the inner Trondheimsfjorden
 Stjørdalen, the Stjørdalen valley
 Trondheim Region, the areas surrounding the large city of Trondheim
 Gauldalen, the Gaula river valley
 Orkdalen, the Orkla river valley

Towns and cities
There are ten towns/cities in Trøndelag, plus the "mining town" of Røros.
Trondheim (in Trondheim municipality)
Steinkjer (in Steinkjer municipality)
Stjørdalshalsen (in Stjørdal municipality)
Levanger (in Levanger municipality)
Namsos (in Namsos municipality)
Rørvik (in Nærøysund municipality)
Verdalsøra (in Verdal municipality)
Orkanger (in Orkdal municipality)
Brekstad (in Ørland municipality)
Kolvereid (in Nærøy municipality)
Bergstaden Røros (in Røros municipality)

Geography 
Along the coast in the southwest are the largest islands in Norway south of the Arctic Circle, including Hitra and Frøya. The broad and long Trondheimsfjord is a main feature, and the lowland surrounding the fjord are among the most important agricultural areas in Norway. In the far south is the mountain ranges Dovrefjell and Trollheimen, and in the southeast is highlands and mountain plateaus, and this is where Røros is situated. North of the Trondheimsfjord is the large Fosen peninsula, where Ørland is at its southwestern tip. Several valleys runs north or west to meet the fjord, with a river at its centre, such as Meldal, Gauldal, Stjørdal, Verdal. Further north is the long Namdalen with the largest river, Namsen, and Namsos is situated where the river meets the Namsen fjord. The rivers are among the best salmon rivers in Europe, especially Namsen, Gaula, and Orkla. On the northwestern part of the region is the Vikna archipelago with almost 6,000 islands and islets.

There are many national parks in the region, including Dovrefjell–Sunndalsfjella National Park, Forollhogna National Park,  Skarvan and Roltdalen National Park, Femundsmarka National Park and Børgefjell National Park.

Climate 
Trøndelag is one of the regions in Norway with the largest climatic variation - from the oceanic climate with mild and wetter winters along the coast to the very cold winters in the southeast inland highlands, where Røros is the only place in southern and central Norway to have recorded . The first overnight freeze (temperature below  in autumn on average is August 24th in Røros, October 9th at Trondheim Airport Værnes, and as late as November 20th at Sula in Frøya. Most of the lowland areas near the fjords have a humid continental climate (or oceanic if -3C is used as winter threshold), while the most oceanic areas along the coast have a temperate oceanic climate with all monthly means above . The inland valleys, hills, and highlands below the treeline have a boreal climate with cold winters and shorter summers, but still with potential for warm summer temperatures. Above the treeline is alpine tundra.

Trøndelag 
There are 38 municipalities in Trøndelag.

Culture

Arts
The region's official theatre is the Trøndelag Teater in Trondheim. At Stiklestad in Verdal, the historical play called The Saint Olav Drama has been played each year since 1954.  It depicts the last days of Saint Olaf.

Jazz on a very high level is frequently heard in Trondheim, due to the high-level jazz education in Trondheim at Institutt for musikk (NTNU). Trondheim is also the national centre of rock music; the popular music museum Rockheim opened there in 2010. Trøndelag is known for its local variety of rock music, often performed in local dialect, called "trønderrock".

Several institutions are nationally funded, including the internationally acclaimed Trondheim Symphony Orchestra, Trondheim Soloists, Olavsfestdagene and Trondheim Chamber Music Festival.

Food and drink
The region is popularly known for its moonshine homebrew, called heimbrent or heimert. Although officially prohibited, the art of producing as pure homemade spirits as possible still has a strong following in parts of Trøndelag. Traditionally the spirit is served mixed with coffee to create a drink called karsk. The strength of the coffee varies, often on a regional basis. The mixing proportions also depend on the strength of the spirit with more coffee being used for spirit with higher alcohol content. In southern regions, people tend to use strong filter coffee, while in the north they typically serve karsk with as weak coffee as possible.

The "official dish" of the region is sodd which is made from diced sheep or beef meat and meatballs in boiled stock. The Norwegian Grey Troender sheep is an endangered breed of domesticated sheep that originated from Trøndelag in the late 19th century. There are currently approximately 50 individual animals remaining and efforts are being made to revive the breed.

See also
 Demographics of Trøndelag

References

External links

 Facts about Trøndelag from Mid-Norway European office
  Insular artifacts from Viking-Age burials from mid-Norway. A review of contact between Trøndelag and Britain and Ireland

 
Counties of Norway
Regions of Norway
Petty kingdoms of Norway
States and territories established in 2018
2018 establishments in Norway